Robert Harold Renken (September 25, 1921 – December 29, 2018) was an American politician in the state of Iowa. Renken was born in Grundy County, Iowa. He was a livestock and grain farmer. He served in the Iowa House of Representatives from 1979 to 1997, as a Republican.

References

1921 births
2018 deaths
Republican Party members of the Iowa House of Representatives
People from Grundy County, Iowa